Reg'lar Fellers is a 1941 American comedy film directed by Arthur Dreifuss and starring Billy Lee, Carl 'Alfalfa' Switzer and Sarah Padden. It was based on the comic strip of the same name. Former silent film star Marguerite De La Motte appears in a supporting role.

Cast
 Billy Lee as Pinhead Duffy 
 Carl 'Alfalfa' Switzer as Bump Hudson 
 Buddy Boles as Jimmy Dugan 
 Janet Dempsey as Aggie Reilly 
 Henry 'Spike' Lee as Skeeter 
 Malcolm Hutton as Puddin'Head Duffy 
 Sarah Padden as Hetty Carter 
 Roscoe Ates as Emory McQuade 
 Danna Callahan as Jane Watson 
 Diane Ware as Hazel Barry 
 Leonard Grassi as Warren Hamilton 
 Sharon Lynne as Baby Carter 
 Maren Mayo as Caroline Carter 
 Netta Packer as Martha 
 Jack C. Smith as Officer Flynn 
 Marguerite De La Motte as Mrs. Dugan 
 Pat O'Malley as Mr. Dugan Sr. 
 Anna Ruth Hughes as Molly Dugan 
 Dan Stowell as Ferrel 
 Lew Laurie as Lubec 
 Daisy Ford as Mrs. Duffy 
 Herb Vigran as Radio Announcer

References

Bibliography
 Buck Rainey. Sweethearts of the sage: biographies and filmographies of 258 actresses appearing in western movies. McFarland & Company Incorporated Pub, 1992.

External links
 
 
 
 
 
 

1941 films
1941 comedy films
American black-and-white films
American comedy films
Films based on comic strips
Films directed by Arthur Dreifuss
Producers Releasing Corporation films
1940s English-language films
1940s American films